Alexander Mann "Ander" Crenshaw (born September 1, 1944) is an American banker, attorney, and politician who served as the U.S. representative for  from 2001 to 2017. He is a member of the Republican Party. Crenshaw retired from Congress when his term ended on January 3, 2017.

Early life, education and career
Crenshaw was born in Jacksonville, and earned his (B.A.) at the University of Georgia in 1966 and later received his J.D. degree from the University of Florida. He was an investment banker before being elected to Congress. Crenshaw served in the Florida State House of Representatives from 1972 to 1978 and in the Florida State Senate from 1986 to 1994. He was the first Republican Senate president in 118 years. Crenshaw was first elected to the United States House of Representatives in 2000.

Early political career

Statewide runs

1978
In 1978, Crenshaw won the Republican primary for Florida Secretary of State. He lost the general election to Democrat George Firestone.

1994

In 1994, he ran for Florida Governor, but lost the primary to Jeb Bush, who won with a plurality of 46%. Crenshaw got just 12% of the vote in fourth place. State Secretary of State Jim Smith and State Treasurer Tom Gallagher got 18% and 13% of the vote respectively.

State Legislature

House
Crenshaw served in the Florida House of Representatives from 1972 through 1978.

Senate
He returned to public office in 1986, winning a special election for a seat in the Florida Senate that he held through 1994. He became the first Republican elected president of the Senate in 118 years in November 1992, but agreed to serve only one year instead of the usual two, as a compromise between Republicans and Democrats who were evenly split in the Senate that year.

U.S. House of Representatives

Committee assignments
 Committee on Appropriations
 Subcommittee on Defense
 Subcommittee on Financial Services and General Government (Chairman)
 Subcommittee on State, Foreign Operations, and Related Programs
 Subcommittee on the Legislative Branch(Chairman during 112th Congress)

Caucus memberships
 Crohn's and Colitis Caucus (Co-chair)
 Effective Foreign Assistance (Co-chair)
 International Conservation Caucus (Co-chair)
 Nepal Caucus (Co-chair)
 Sportsmen's Caucus
 Tea Party Caucus
 Congressional Cement Caucus

Tenure

Crenshaw largely kept a low profile during his congressional tenure. By the end of his tenure, he was a Deputy Majority Whip in the Republican leadership.

On September 29, 2008, Crenshaw voted for the Emergency Economic Stabilization Act of 2008 which created the Troubled Assets Relief Program. He was one of only three Florida Republicans to do so.

Despite his support of the bill, he issued a press release to "applaud the organizers and participants" of the April 15, 2009, First Coast Tax Day Tea Party in Jacksonville, one of the many 2009 Tea Party protests which condemned any bailouts.

On July 2, 2014, Crenshaw introduced the Financial Services and General Government Appropriations Act, 2015 (H.R. 5016; 113th Congress), an appropriations bill for fiscal year 2015 that would provide funding for the United States Department of the Treasury, as we all as the United States federal courts, the Executive Office of the President of the United States, and Washington, D.C.

On April 13, 2016, Crenshaw announce that he would be retiring and would not seek re-election, thereby concluding his congressional tenure after 16 years.

Political campaigns
In 1980, Crenshaw finished third in the Republican primary for a U.S. Senate seat, earning roughly 13% of the vote behind Paula Hawkins and Louis Frey, Jr.

In 1994, he unsuccessfully sought the Republican nomination for governor, winning several counties but ultimately losing out to Jeb Bush. Crenshaw finished fourth (12.1%) behind Tom Gallagher and Jim Smith.

In 2000, Crenshaw returned to politics when he won the Republican nomination for the 4th District after Tillie Fowler retired to honor a self-imposed four-term limit. This district included just over half of Jacksonville, as well as most of its suburbs. He easily won in November, becoming only the fourth person to represent this district since its creation in 1943 (it was the 2nd District from 1943 to 1967, the 3rd District from 1967 to 1993, and has been the 4th since 1993). He was reelected five times with no substantive opposition in what has become one of the most Republican districts in Florida. He even ran unopposed in 2002 and 2004, and faced no major-party opposition in 2010 or 2012.

2010

Crenshaw was challenged by Independent Troy Stanley. Gary L. Koniz and Deborah "Deb" Katz Pueschel also qualified as write-ins.

Personal life
Crenshaw is a son-in-law of former Governor of Florida Claude Roy Kirk, Jr. and has two grown daughters with his wife Kitty, whom he has been married to for over 44 years.

Awards and honors

In 2013, Ander Crenshaw was awarded the Malaria Action Award for his work against malaria by Malaria No More.

References

External links

 
 
 

|-

|-

|-

|-

|-

1944 births
21st-century American politicians
Republican Party Florida state senators
Living people
Republican Party members of the Florida House of Representatives
People from Jacksonville, Florida
Presidents of the Florida Senate
Robert E. Lee High School (Jacksonville) alumni
Republican Party members of the United States House of Representatives from Florida
Tea Party movement activists
Fredric G. Levin College of Law alumni